Sabarmati–Patan DEMU is a DEMU train belonging to Western Railway zone that runs between  and  of Gujarat. It is currently being operated with 79433/79434 and 79435/79436 train numbers on daily basis.

Route and halts

The important halts of the train are:

Average speed and frequency

79435/Sabarmati BG–Patan DEMU has average speed of 39 km/h and completes 103 km in 1 hour 40 minutes. 79436/Patan–Sabarmati BG DEMU has average speed of 44 km/h and completes 103 km in 2 hour 20 minutes.
79433/Sabarmati BG–Patan DEMU has average speed of 40 km/h and completes 103 km in 1 hour 40 minutes. 79434/Patan–Sabarmati BG DEMU has average speed of 44 km/h and completes 103 km in 2 hour 20 minutes.

There are seven trains which run on a daily basis.

Schedule

Traction 

DEMU: Rated power is 1600 HP and has 10 coaches with maximum speed is 110 kmph. Transmission is AC electric. Rakes are made at ICF coach.

See also 

 Patan railway station
 Mahesana–Abu Road DEMU

Notes

References 

Patan district
Transport in Ahmedabad
Rail transport in Gujarat
Diesel–electric multiple units of India
Railway services introduced in 2011